Huan Hesketh (or Hugh Hesketh) was a pre-Reformation clergyman who served as the Bishop of Sodor and Man in the early 16th-century.

He was appointed the bishop of the Diocese of Sodor and Man by papal provision on 15 April or 18 May 1513. It is not known when his episcopate ended, but his successor John Howden was appointed in May or June 1523.

References 

 
 
 
 
 

16th-century English Roman Catholic bishops
Bishops of Sodor and Man
Year of birth unknown
Year of death unknown